Rashid Masharawi (also: "Rashid Mashrawi") is a Palestinian film director, born in Gaza in 1962 to a family of refugees from Jaffa. He grew up in the Shati refugee camp.

Rashid Masharawi lives and works in Ramallah, where he founded the Cinema Production and Distribution Center in 1996 with the aim of promoting local film productions. He also sponsors a mobile cinema, which allows him to screen films in Palestinian refugee camps. Other projects include the annual Kids Film Festival and major workshops on film production and directing. Rashid Masharawi regularly organises readings and discussion forums at the Al-Matal cultural centre. Through his documentaries and feature films, he has made a name for himself as a film artist and has received several film awards.

Films
Travel Document (1987)
The Shelter, (1989) Fiction 
Dar o dur (1991)
The Magician (1992)
Curfew (Hatta Ishaar Akhar) (1994) At the Cannes International Film Festival he was awarded the Unesco Film Award for Curfew (1994) and received the audience and critics’ prize for the best film at the Montpellier Film Festival.
Haifa (1996)
Rabab (1997)
Tension (1998)
Love Season (2001)
 (2002), feature film  won a number of awards.
Live from Palestine, (2002) Docu. 57 min. 
Homemovie (2002)
Checkpoint (2002)
Waiting, (2005) Film / TV, Feature film. Film Review: Rashid Masharawi's "Waiting", by Ali Abunimah, 8 May 2006, the Electronic Intifada
Arafat, my Brother, Film, (2005) / TV, Documentary.
Laila's Birthday (2008)
Land of the Story (2012)
Palestine Stereo (2013)
Letters From Al Yarmouk (2014)
Writing On Snow (2017)

See also 
 Duki Dror

References

External links
An Interview with the Palestinian Filmmaker Rashid Masharawi by Fareed Armaly, April 2002
Rashid Masharawi - filmmaker by Monique Roffey, Paul Prillevitz, and Khaled Hourani, 19.06.2006

Rashid Masharawi, Buthina Canaan Khoury, Nahed Awwad, Hazim Bitar, Annemarie Jacir and Ahmad Habash by Kamran Rastegar, Bidoun, Fall 2006

Further reading
Gertz, Nurith; Khleifi, George  (2008): Palestinian Cinema: Landscape, Trauma, and Memory,  Chapter 4. Without place, Without time: The films of Rashid Masharawi (p. 101-118), Indiana University Press.  

1962 births
Living people
Palestinian film directors
People from the Gaza Strip